Shihua is a subdistrict of Ningjiang District, Songyuan, in northwestern Jilin province, China. , it has 3 residential communities under its administration.

See also 
 List of township-level divisions of Jilin

References 

Township-level divisions of Jilin